Guy Coombs (June 15, 1882 – December 29, 1947) was an American stage and screen actor who had a prolific career during the silent era. He was born in Washington, D. C. and died in Los Angeles, California. He left films in 1922 to work in real-estate in Florida.

Coombs appeared in films from Edison, Kalem, Kleine and Metro Pictures.

Coombs was married at one time to Anna Q. Nilsson.

Selected filmography
Nell's Last Deal (1911)
Aida (1911)
Edna's Imprisonment (1911)
Captain Nell (1911)
A Celebrated Case (1914)
Bab's Diary (1917)
Bab's Burglar (1917)
The Uphill Path (1918)
Flower of the Dusk (1920)
The Wrong Woman (1920)
When Knighthood Was in Flower (1922)
That Woman (1922)

References

External links

1882 births
1947 deaths
Male actors from Washington, D.C.